Disney's Noah is a 1998 television film directed by Ken Kwapis. The movie premiered on October 11, 1998 as part of The Wonderful World of Disney and stars Tony Danza as a modern-day jaded contractor who undergoes a remarkable transformation while building an ark like Noah's. It also stars Wallace Shawn and Jane Sibbett.

Plot

In order to save his family and home town, contractor Norman Waters (Tony Danza) is tasked by an angel named Zach (Wallace Shawn) to rebuild Noah's Ark in 40 days to prepare for a great massive flood.

Cast
 Tony Danza as Norman Waters
 Wallace Shawn as Zach
 Jane Sibbett as Angela
 Chris Marquette as Daniel Waters
 Jesse Moss as Levon Waters
 Michal Suchánek as Benny Waters
 Lloyd Berry as Noah
 Kevin McNulty as Norman's boss
 Nicola Cavendish as Penelope  the restaurant owner
 Paul Coeur as Ray the bribe taking Inspector
 Jane McGregor as Kathy Simmons  Levon's girlfriend
 Joe Norman Shaw as Aris Norman's competitor
 Jaia Talisman as Cute woman (as Anita Matthys) Aris’ girlfriend
 Melanie Merkosky as Cheerleader #1
 Lisa Christie as Telephone Girl #3
 Kyla Wise as Elevator Girl (as Kyla Anderson)
 Linda Red Hawk: Yoga Teacher

Reception
In reviewing films influenced by the tale of Noah's Ark, Dan Craft of The Pantagraph called Noah a "dire Disney Channel offering".

References

External links
 

1998 television films
1998 films
Disney television films
Films directed by Ken Kwapis
Films scored by Van Dyke Parks
1998 comedy films
Noah's Ark in film